The following is a list of all mayors ("Oberbürgermeister" or "Lord Mayor") of Freiburg, Baden-Württemberg, since 1806.

1806–1824: Johann Josef Adrians
1826–1827: Fidel Andre
1828–1832: Raimund Bannwarth
1833–1839: Joseph von Rotteck
1839–1840: Friedrich Wagner
1848–1849: Joseph von Rotteck
1850–1852: Johann Baptist Rieder
1852–1859: Friedrich Wagner
1859–1871: Eduard Fauler
1871–1876: Karl Schuster
1876-1888: Christian Bauer
1888–1913: Otto Winterer
1913–1922: Emil Thoma
1922–1933: Karl Bender
1933–1945: Franz Kerber
1945–1946: Max Keller
1946–1956: Wolfgang Hoffmann
1956–1962: Josef Brandel
1962–1982: Eugen Keidel
1982–2002: Rolf Böhme
since 2002: Dieter Salomon

Freiburg 
Baden-Württemberg-related lists